Claylick is an unincorporated community in Montgomery Township in Franklin County, Pennsylvania, United States. Claylick is located at the intersection of state routes 75 and 995, south of Mercersburg.

Clay Lick was laid out circa 1831, and named after nearby Clay Lick Mountain. A post office called Clay Lick was established in 1862, the name was changed to Claylick in 1895, and the post office closed in 1905.

References

Unincorporated communities in Franklin County, Pennsylvania
Unincorporated communities in Pennsylvania